Lucilina is a genus of polyplacophoran molluscs. It includes species known from fossil remains, as well as living species. It is often considered a subgenus of Tonicia.

Species
 Lucilina amanda
 Lucilina carnosa
 Lucilina carpenteri
 Lucilina ceylonica
 Lucilina dilecta
 Lucilina dupuisi
 Lucilina floccata
 Lucilina fortilirata
 Lucilina hulliana
 Lucilina indica
 Lucilina lamellosa
 Lucilina mariae
 Lucilina nigropunctata
 Lucilina novemrugata
 Lucilina pacifica
 Lucilina pectinoides
 Lucilina perligera
 Lucilina polyomma
 Lucilina reticulata
 Lucilina russelli  Ladd, 1966
 Lucilina sowerbyi
 Lucilina sueziensis
 Lucilina tilbrooki
 Lucilina truncata
 Lucilina tydemani
 Lucilina variegata

References 

Chiton genera
Prehistoric chiton genera
Fossil taxa described in 1882